This is a list of the cities and towns in New England with population over 25,000 persons as of the 2020 census. Massachusetts contains the most cities and towns on the list with 80, while Vermont contains the fewest with just one. Neither Vermont's (Montpelier) nor Maine's (Augusta) state capitals fall within the top 150 by population.

List 
The table below contains the following information:

 The city rank by population as of 2020
 The name of the state in which the city lies
 Population as of April 1, 2020, as counted by the 2020 United States Census
 Population as of April 1, 2010, according to the 2010 United States Census
 Percent change in population from April 1, 2010, to April 1, 2020

States with the most cities 
New England states with the most cities and towns over 25,000 population as of April 1, 2020.

Gallery

See also 

List of United States cities by population
List of largest cities of U.S. states and territories by population
List of municipalities in Massachusetts
List of towns in Connecticut
List of municipalities in Rhode Island
List of cities in Maine
List of cities and towns in New Hampshire
List of cities in Vermont
United States
Outline of the United States
Index of United States–related articles
United States Census Bureau
Demographics of the United States
Urbanization in the United States
List of states and territories of the United States by population
List of United States cities by population
Cities and metropolitan areas of the United States
United States Office of Management and Budget
Statistical area (United States)
Combined statistical area (list)
Core-based statistical area (list)
Metropolitan statistical area (list)
Micropolitan statistical area (list)
List of most populous cities in the United States by decade
List of largest cities (most populous cities in the world)
Lists of populated places in the United States
List of United States cities by population density
List of United States urban areas

References

New England
New England